Kenneth Kimuli Amooti (born 23 September 1978) is a Ugandan comedian, playwright and journalist. He is well known as Pablo in the Ugandan comedy circles. He won the first Multi-Choice Stand Up Uganda comedy competition. After losing both parents to HIV/AIDS at an early age, he has formed charity organisations; Pill Power Uganda and Tangaza Arts Centre which aim to support youth living with HIV/AIDS.

Early life 
Kimuli was born on 23 September 1978 in Mbale to Stephen Isingoma and Enid Kirungi Katungwensi Isingoma. He was the seventh born in a family of nine children. He went to Macknon Kindergarten, Kampala in his nursery, then joined Shimoni Demonstration Primary School.

In 1988, Kimuli's father died of HIV/AIDS. Because of this, the family relocated to Mbarara where he continued his primary schooling in Boma Primary School and later on Bweranyangi Primary School where he did his Primary Leaving Examinations in 1993. in that same year, when he was 14 years old, he lost his mother to HIV/AIDS. Because they had lost both parents, the children were distributed to be taken care of by different relatives who were living in Masindi, Mbarara and Kabarole districts. Kimuli's maternal uncle Stephen Isingoma and his wife Joan Musiime Mushagara became his guardians.

He continued his education in Mbarara High School where he sat his UCE in 1997 and later on UACE in 1999. Kimuli then went to Namasagali University, acquiring a bachelor's degree in Mass Media, Journalism and Creative Writing in 2003

Career

Journalism 
After graduation, in 2003, Kimuli started to look for a job but failed to get one. He tried writing articles for newspapers but they were trashed. He then started his own Newspaper called Vanguard but it failed within six months.

In 2004, he joined the Daily Monitor newspaper, where he was a freelance journalist. He worked with the newspaper until 2008.

He was a radio presenter with Power FM 104.1 in 2004. This is where he acquired the Pablo name. He ended working with the radio station in 2009.

Between 2006 and 2013 Kimuli was appointed Productions Director of a radio drama called Rock Point 256.

In 2009, he joined The Observer Newspaper as a humour columnist.

Comedy 
Kimuli attributes his comedy to his parents who he says were humourists of their own generation. While in Mbarara High School, he stood for food prefect just for fun and he won and that's when he knew he was meant for comedy

In 2004, he was assigned by the Daily Monitor newspaper to write an article on Theatre Factory. Afterwards he kept on going back to watch them during rehearsals as he gave them tips. This led to his being invited to join the group. He joined Theatre Factory in 2005.

In 2007, he was invited by Robert Redford to the Sundance Theatre Program in the USA where he shared the stage with celebrated film actors and actresses.

In 2009, he won the MultiChoice Stand Up Uganda walking away with $10,000. He later started his own weekly show called Pablo Live after leaving Theatre Factory. Later on, the show was changed to every last Friday of the month. After eight years of Pablo Live, it closed in 2016 and later reopened almost a year later in 2017. 

in February 2010, Kimuli performed at the Comedy Club Live in Lagos, Nigeria. In November, he performed at the Comedy Club Live in Mombasa, Kenya

In 2012, he performed in the Nights of 1000 Laughs in Kampala.

In 2013, He launched a live show called Pablo and the Continental Comedian. This show featured different comedians brought from different parts of Africa like Chibwe Katebe from Zambia, Allan Bloo and Mandy Uzonitsha from Nigeria,

In 2016 he was nominated in the World's Funniest Comedian competition.

Kimuli has mentored other comedians into the industry like Herbert Ssegujja (Teacher Mpamire), and has inspired others like Ronnie McVex to start doing comedy. Through his Pablo Live Comfort Clinic, new comedians like Gocher were able to join comedy. Comedian Patrick Salvador Idringi attributes the lifting of the Uganda comedy industry from scratch to Kimuli and Amooti Omubaranguzi.

In 2019 he was named as one of the highest paid comedians in Uganda

Genre of Comedy 
Mainly observational comedy and satire.

Host 
In 2016, he hosted the Qwela Christmas party held by Qwela Junction.

In 2017, together with Anne Kansiime, he co hosted a music show by Oliver Mtukudzi in The "Lockdown Show."

Politics 
in October 2020, Kenneth was nominated to stand as a  Member of Parliament of Bunyangabu District for 2021-2026

Charity Work 
In 2013, he organised a fete called Comedy Meets Music that attracted artists, including Zambian gospel singer, Pompi among others, to raise money to help spread information about HIV/AIDS. In 2014, he organised another Comedy Meets Music show which attracted over 10 comedians including Dr. Ofweneke from Kenya and 10 musicians. Proceeds from this show support went to the Zip-up 256 HIV/Aids prevention campaign

In 2013, Kimuli founded the Zip Up Campaign aimed at young people to fight HIV/AIDS. . In 2014, Kimuli partnered with Uganda AIDS Commission in the Zip Up 256 campaign which aimed to reach out to "schools and universities using entertainment and testimonies by youth infected with the virus" .

In 2015, he formed an organisation called Pill Power Uganda which he runs, together with youth living and affected by HIV/AIDS. where he mentors people living with HIV/AIDs

He formed another charity, Tangaza Arts Centre in 2016 where young people living with HIV/AIDS are armed with life skills. Tebere Art Centre was also formed in the same year. In 2009, during Easter weekend, together with Power fm, he participated in a reach out program to the prisoners in Luzira Maximum Security Prison that included performing stand-up comedy and interactions.

In 2016, he partnered Reach A Hand Uganda to sensitize and raise awareness to student leaders and teachers from over 10 different secondary schools on matters concerning HIV/AIDS.

Personal life 
Kimuli is married to Karen Hasahya, a former Miss Ugandan contestant and Miss Talent 2003. They met on 24 October 2009 in church. He proposed to her on 14 February 2010 and they got married on 4 September 2010 by Pastor Gary Skinner of Watoto Church. Together they have two children, Kangye Weishemwe Kimuli Amooti and Kunda Wekitinisa Kirungi Acaali

Kimuli, originally an Anglican, is a Born again Christian. Having been a heavy drinker and smoker, he got saved in after he turned on the television and heard Joyce Meyer preaching.

Kimuli is a Rotarian with Rotary Club of Kampala North

Stage

Awards 

|-
! scope="row" | 2008
| Buzz Teeniez Awards
|
| Best Television Personality
| 
| 
| style="text-align:center;"|
|-
! scope="row" | 2009
| Multichoice Stand Up Uganda
| 
| King of Comedy
| 
| 
| style="text-align:center;"|
|-
! scope="row" | 2009
| Buzz Teeniez Awards
| 
| Best Television Personality
| 
| 
| style="text-align:center;"|
|-
! scope="row" | 2010
| New Vision Publication Readers Opinion Poll
| 
| Best local actor
| 
| 
| style="text-align:center;"|
|-
! scope="row" | 2012
| Edutainment Awards
| 
| Best performing artist
| 
| 
| style="text-align:center;"|
|-
! scope="row" | 2013
| Ugandan Social Media awards
| Entertainment
| Best Entertainment Writer
| 
| 
| style="text-align:center;"|
|-
! scope="row" | 2013
| Young Achievers Awards
| Performing Arts
| Outstanding Performing Arts Award
| 
| 
| style="text-align:center;"|
|-
! scope="row" | 2016
| Laugh Factory
| 
| Funniest person in the world
| 
| 
| style="text-align:center;"|
|-
! scope="row" | 2018
| TITANS: Building Nations CEO Global Awards
| Arts and Media
| Country winner in Great Lakes Region
| 
| 
| style="text-align:center;"|
|-
! scope="row" | 2018
| TITANS: Building Nations CEO Global Awards
| Arts and Media
| Regional winner in Great Lakes Region
| 
| 
| style="text-align:center;"|
|-
! scope="row" | 2018
| TITANS: Building Nations CEO Global Awards
| Arts and Media
| Continental Award
| 
| 
| style="text-align:center;"|

References 

1978 births
Living people
Ugandan journalists
People from Mbale District
Ugandan stand-up comedians
21st-century Ugandan writers
Ugandan male writers